Alopoglossus stenolepis is a species of lizard in the family Alopoglossidae. It is endemic to in Colombia, mainly near Cali.

References

Alopoglossus
Reptiles of Colombia
Endemic fauna of Colombia
Reptiles described in 1908
Taxa named by George Albert Boulenger
Taxobox binomials not recognized by IUCN